The 1922 Sam Houston Normal Bear Cats football team represented Sam Houston Normal Institute (now known as Sam Houston State University) as an independent  during the 1923 college football season. Led by third-year head coach Mutt Gee, Sam Houston compiled an overall record of 3–4.

Schedule

References

Sam Houston Normal
Sam Houston Bearkats football seasons
Sam Houston Normal football